The Utsunomiya Line is the name given to a  section of the Tōhoku Main Line between Tokyo Station in Tokyo and Kuroiso Station in Nasushiobara, Tochigi, Japan. It is part of the East Japan Railway Company (JR East) network.

Services 
Services on the Utsunomiya Line are typically divided into three categories: services to or from Ueno, Shōnan–Shinjuku Line services, and Ueno–Tokyo Line services. Between Ueno and Ōmiya, trains share the track with the Takasaki Line, both of which serve as de facto express services compared to the parallel Keihin–Tōhoku Line.

The fastest service on the line, the rapid Rabbit, makes the run between Ueno and Utsunomiya in 1 hour and 26 minutes.

Service on the line is generally divided at Utsunomiya, though the number of through trains had been increasing steadily over the years. South of Utsunomiya, 10- and 15-car E231-1000/E233-3000 series four-door suburban commuter EMUs with Green cars attached service the line, while to the north service was provided chiefly by 4-car 205-600 series four-door EMUs. Starting 12 March 2022, all services north of Utsunomiya until Kuroiso use E131-600/-680 series EMUs, and through services using suburban 10/15-car trains ceased to operate.

Limited express 
Limited express services use the line, including:
 Nikkō / Spacia Nikkō / Kinugawa / Spacia Kinugawa (from Ikebukuro/Shinjuku to Kurihashi and on to the Tōbu Nikkō Line)

Local/rapid services

Rapid Rabbit 
This service stops at every station on the Tōkaidō Line, and skips some stations on the Utsunomiya Line. Rabbit trains were first operated by the Japanese National Railways as an hourly/half-hourly rapid service. From October 2004, Rabbit services ran only twice during the morning; on weekends, they replaced the weekday commuter rapid service.

Local 
Local trains run four times hourly; one of those terminates at Koganei, while the rest terminate at Utsunomiya. During the morning peak, Tokyo-bound trains run at intervals of 4–6 minutes. Services are provided by E231/E233 series 10- or 15-car EMUs. Most trains continue south to the Tōkaidō Line through the Ueno–Tokyo Line, while some trains terminate at Ueno.

Shōnan–Shinjuku Line services 

Within the Utsunomiya Line, Shōnan–Shinjuku Line rapid and local trains are each operated once per hour. They do not stop at Saitama-Shintoshin Station since it has no platforms available. They operate between Zushi on the Yokosuka Line and Utsunomiya.

Rapid 
Rapid trains operate once hourly, making limited stops. The travel time between Shinjuku and Utsunomiya is about 1 hour and 35 minutes.

Local 
Local trains operate once hourly (twice hourly during the morning), stopping at all stations. The travel time between Shinjuku and Ōmiya is about 32 minutes.

Utsunomiya – Kuroiso services 
Between Utsunomiya and Kuroiso, local trains stop at every station. Trains operate approximately two times per hour, traveling between Utsunomiya and Kuroiso in approximately 50 minutes. All trains use E131-600/-680 series EMUs.

Past services

Commuter rapid 
Commuter rapid services for Utsunomiya made fewer stops than the Rabbit rapid services. They were operated only on weekday evenings, between Ueno and Utsunomiya. Trains departed Ueno between 18:00 and 22:00, and Utsunomiya between 16:00 and 21:00, with approximately one round-trip per hour. All trains were E231/E233 series 10- or 15-car EMUs. This service ended on 12 March 2021.

Rapid Acty 

From March 2015, with the Ueno–Tokyo Line opening, Tōkaidō Line Rapid Acty services ran up along the Utsunomiya Line. Services stopped at every station on the Utsunomiya Line, and skipped some stations on the Tōkaidō Line. Since 13 March 2021, Acty services stopped running through to the Utsunomiya Line.

Limited Express 
 Ohayō Tochigi・Hometown Tochigi
 Hokutosei, Cassiopeia (once or twice daily night trains)

Home Liner Koga 
Two trains bound for Koga depart Ueno every weekday evening. Passengers can board only at Ueno; all other stations are for disembarking only. Stops include: Ueno, Urawa, Ōmiya, Higashi-Ōmiya, Hasuda, Kuki, and Koga. Service is provided by 7-car 185 series and 9-car 489 series EMUs.

Station list 
 Local trains, excluding Shōnan–Shinjuku Line through trains, stop at all stations within the Utsunomiya Line (except Nippori)
 For limited express services, please see their respective articles.

Legends:

 ● : All trains stop
 ｜: All trains pass
 ▼: Shōnan–Shinjuku Line trains stop, but use dedicated platforms on the Tōhoku Freight Line
 ∥ : Shōnan–Shinjuku Line trains do not travel within this section

Rolling stock

Tokyo—Ueno—Utsunomiya
 E231-1000 series EMUs
 E233-3000 series EMUs

Oyama—Utsunomiya—Kuroiso
 E131-600/-680 series 3-car EMUs (since 12 March 2022)

Utsunomiya—Hōshakuji (Karasuyama Line through service)
 EV-E301 series BEMUs

Former rolling stock

Koganei—Utsunomiya—Kuroiso
 205-600 series EMUs (until 11 March 2022)

From March 2013, a fleet of eight refurbished 4-car 205-600 series EMUs was phased in on Utsunomiya Line services between Utsunomiya and Kuroiso, replacing 211 series sets. These operated until 11 March 2022 when they were replaced by new build 3-car E131-600/-680 series EMUs.

History

See also
 Tōhoku Main Line
 Takasaki Line
 Shōnan–Shinjuku Line
 Ueno–Tokyo Line

References

External links

 Stations of the Tōhoku Main Line (JR East) 

Utsunomiya Line
Lines of East Japan Railway Company
Rail transport in Ibaraki Prefecture
Rail transport in Tochigi Prefecture
Rail transport in Saitama Prefecture
Railway lines in Tokyo
1067 mm gauge railways in Japan
Railway lines opened in 1883
1500 V DC railway electrification